The Vostok-2M ( meaning "East"), GRAU index 8A92M was an expendable carrier rocket used by the Soviet Union between 1964 and 1991. Ninety-three were launched, of which one failed. Another was destroyed before launch. It was originally built as a specialised version of the earlier Vostok-2, for injecting lighter payloads into higher sun-synchronous orbits. It was a member of the R-7 family of rockets, and the last Vostok.

The Vostok-2M made its maiden flight on 28 August 1964, from Site 31/6 at the Baikonur Cosmodrome, successfully placing Kosmos 44, a Meteor weather satellite into orbit. Its only launch failure occurred on 1 February 1969, when the launch of a Meteor failed due to an upper stage problem.

At 16:01 GMT on 18 March 1980, a Vostok-2M exploded during fueling at Plesetsk Site 43/4, ahead of the launch of a Tselina-D satellite, killing 48 people who were working on the rocket at the time. A filter in a hydrogen peroxide tank of the third stage had accidentally been soldered with lead instead of tin, with the catalytically active lead solder on the filter causing the explosion upon contact hydrogen peroxide. As a consequence, the H2O2 broke down, overheated, and melted the solder, causing pieces to fall into the H2O2 storage tank and cause a runaway chemical reaction. This led to a fire inside the third stage and eventual explosion which resulted in the complete destruction of the launch vehicle and severe pad damage (LC-43 did not host another launch for three years).

Vostok-2M launches occurred from Site 31/6 at Baikonur, and Sites 41/1 and 43 at Plesetsk. It is unclear if any were launched from Site 1/5 at Baikonur. The Vostok-2M was retired in 1991, in favour of standardisation on the Soyuz-U and U2 rockets. The final flight was conducted on 29 August, and carried the IRS-1B satellite for the Indian Space Research Organisation.

References 

Space launch vehicles of the Soviet Union
R-7 (rocket family)